George Spratt may refer to:

 George A. Spratt (1870–1934), inventor and aircraft patentee
 George W. Spratt (1844–1934), American manufacturer and politician